Oralin may refer to:
 Oralin (insulin)
Sertraline, an antidepressant known by the trade name Oralin